Eunidia kristenseni is a species of beetle in the family Cerambycidae. It was described by Per Olof Christopher Aurivillius in 1911. It is known from tropical Africa.

Subspecies
 Eunidia kristenseni kristenseni Aurivillius, 1911
 Eunidia kristenseni sabiensis Breuning, 1981

Varieties
 Eunidia kristenseni var. albida Breuning, 1940
 Eunidia kristenseni var. flavomaculata Breuning, 1942

References

Eunidiini
Beetles described in 1911